Esposito is a common Italian surname. It ranks fourth among the most widespread surnames in Italy. It originates from the Campania region, most specifically, in the Naples area.

Etymology and history

Etymologically, this surname is thought to derive from Latin  (Italian , Old Italian or dialect esposito), which is the past participle of the Latin verb exponere ("to place outside", "to expose") and literally means "placed outside", "exposed".

Italian tradition claims that the surname was given to foundlings who were abandoned or placed for adoption and handed over to an orphanage (an Ospizio degli esposti in Italian, literally a "home or hospice of the exposed"). They were called espositi because they would get abandoned and "exposed" in a public place. Some orphanages maintained a so-called Ruota degli esposti (English: "Wheel of the exposed") where abandoned children could be placed. After the unification of Italy, laws were introduced forbidding the practice of giving surnames that reflected a child's origins. A crude meaning is bastard or out of wedlock child.

As a surname, Esposito has produced a number of variants throughout modern Italy, such as D'Esposito, Degli Esposti, Esposti, Esposto, Sposito, etc. Other variants are also found in the Spanish-speaking world, for example Espósito and Expósito.

Notable people
 Andrée Esposito, French opera singer
 André Reinaldo de Souza Esposito, better known simply as Andrezinho, Brazilian professional footballer
 Angelo Esposito, Canadian ice hockey player
 Antonio Esposito, multiple people
 Cameron Esposito, American comedian
 Carlos Esposito, retired Argentine football referee
 Chloe Esposito, Australian Pentathlete
 Christian Esposito, Italian-Australian footballer
 Dennis Esposito, Italian footballer 
 Dino Esposito, an MSDN magazine columnist
 Ester Expósito, Spanish actress and model
 Felissa Rose Esposito, Italian-American actress
 Franck Esposito, French swimmer
 Frank Esposito, multiple people
 Gaetano Esposito, Italian painter
 Giancarlo Esposito, American actor
 Giani Esposito, French film actor and singer-songwriter
 Gino Esposito, a fictional character on the Australian soap opera Neighbours
 Iosu Expósito, Spanish musician 
 Javier Esposito, a fictional character on the American comedy-drama television series Castle
 Jennifer Esposito, American actress
 Joe Esposito, multiple people
 Joseph Esposito, multiple people
 John Esposito, American professor at Georgetown University
 Juan José Expósito Ruiz, Spanish footballer
 Larry W. Esposito, American planetary astronomer
 Mariana Espósito, Argentine actress and singer
 Mario Esposito (scholar), scholar of Hiberno-Latin literature, son of Michele Esposito
Mark Esposito, Swiss Economist and Professor of Business and Economics at Harvard University and Hult International Business School
 Mauro Esposito, Italian footballer
 Mary Ann Esposito, American cooking show host
 Max Esposito, Australian modern pentathlete
 Michele Esposito, Italian-born musical composer and pianist who lived most of his professional life in Dublin, Ireland
 Mike Esposito, multiple people
 Monica Esposito, Scholar of Chinese religion
 Pablo Despósito, Argentine footballer
 Phil Esposito, Canadian ice hockey player
 Phillip T. Esposito, US Army Captain, homicide victim 
 Raffaele Esposito, Italian tavern owner
 Ralph Esposito, Podiatric surgeon
 Roberto Esposito, Italian philosopher
 Rosario Francesco Esposito, Italian Roman Catholic priest
 Salvatore Esposito, multiple people
 Sammy Esposito, American baseball player and college baseball coach
 Sebastiano Esposito, Italian footballer
 Tony Esposito, Canadian ice hockey goalie and younger brother of Phil Esposito
 Tony Esposito, musician, singer-songwriter and drummer from Italy
 Unai Expósito, Spanish footballer
 Vincenzo Esposito, Italian basketball coach
 Vincenzo Esposito, Italian footballer and coach

References

Italian-language surnames
Surnames from nicknames